Magdalis lecontei is a species of wedge-shaped bark weevil in the beetle family Curculionidae. It is found in North America.

Subspecies
These four subspecies belong to the species Magdalis lecontei:
 Magdalis lecontei decepta Sleeper, 1955
 Magdalis lecontei lecontei
 Magdalis lecontei superba
 Magdalis lecontei tinctipennis

References

Further reading

 
 

Curculionidae
Articles created by Qbugbot
Beetles described in 1873